Frédéric Thomas may refer to:

 Frédéric Thomas (footballer) (born 1980), French footballer
 Frédéric Thomas (playwright) (1814–1884), French politician and playwright

See also 
 Frederick Thomas (disambiguation)